Roger Skiddy, Rector of Kilmore, County Cavan then Dean of Limerick,  was Bishop of Cork and Cloyne from 1557 until his resignation in 1566.

References

Bishops of Cork and Cloyne
16th-century Anglican bishops in Ireland